Melanie J Marden (born 1975) is a Canadian actress, model and producer known for starring in the movie Pigs (2007) and the reality TV series Friends to Lovers?. In 2018, she appeared in rapper T.I.'s music video as First Lady Melania Trump. The provocative nature of the music video sparked outrage, especially among Trump supporters.

Early life 
Marden was born in Toronto, Ontario. She lost her mother to brain cancer in 2009.

Career 
Marden is most famously known for her role in the soap opera Friends to Lovers? She's also known for playing the role of Gabrielle in the teen comedy film Pigs (2007).

In 2010, she produced and starred in the short film Timeless, which is based on the true story of her mother who died of brain cancer.

She was also on the cover of Maxim Italy's March edition in 2014.

In 2018, she appeared as a Melania Trump lookalike in a music video of rapper T.I.  The video shows Marden dressed as the First Lady, stripping in the oval office. It sparked outrage and Marden even received death threats for her provocative portrayal of the First Lady. Melania Trump's spokeswoman called the video 'disrespectful and disgusting'. Marden didn't apologize for the video and shared a message on her Instagram saying, "I was hired (as an actress) not a stripper to portray Melania Trump. It was a creative choice for me, and also an opportunity to empower women."

Personal life 
Marden was married to Craig Fury in 2008 and they were divorced in 2011.

Filmography

Film

Television

References

External links 

1975 births
Living people
Actresses from Toronto
Female models from Ontario
Canadian film actresses
Canadian television actresses